Gaston Henri de Bourbon, Duke of Verneuil (3 November 1601 – 28 May 1682), was the bishop of Metz from 1612 to 1652, despite not being ordained. In his early 50s he was displaced and had a career as a diplomat.

Biography

Henri was born in the Château de Vincennes on 3 November 1601, the illegitimate son of King Henry IV of France and his mistress, Catherine Henriette de Balzac d'Entragues. He was declared legitimate in 1603, at the age of two. 

His sister was Gabrielle Angelique, called Mlle de Verneuil (1603–1627), married Bernard de Nogaret de La Valette. His half-siblings included King Louis XIII of France, Christine of France, Duchess of Savoy and César, Duke of Vendôme.

The bishopric of Metz was intended for him from infancy, but when Bishop Charles of Lorraine died in 1607, Pope Paul V refused to appoint a young child of seven. The House of Lorraine had controlled the see since 1484, usually with a family member as bishop, which Paris was keen to bring to an end.  The elderly Anne d'Escars de Givry, bishop of Lisieux, was appointed as placeholder bishop, and Henri was given an expectative appointment, in effect a reservation, plus a pension from the revenues, until he reached adult age. Pope Paul V agreed to appoint him in 1612, after the death of d'Escars, at the request of Louis XIII, despite Henri being only 11 and not ordained. He was never ordained and never resided at Metz, appointing deputies to run diocesan affairs.    

He resigned as bishop in favour of Cardinal Mazarin in 1652, a move Pope Innocent X did not recognize. He was declared dismissed by Pope Alexander VII in 1659. He was knighted on 31 December 1661 and created duke of Verneuil in 1663. In 1665 he became ambassador to England and in 1666 was made governor of Languedoc. He married Charlotte (1622-1704), daughter of the chancellor Pierre Séguier and widow of Maximilien François de Bethune, 2nd Duke of Sully (1614–1661), on 29 October 1668, when he was 67 and she 46. He died without issue on 28 May 1682 at Château de Verneuil.

Ancestry

References

Sources

1601 births
1682 deaths
17th-century peers of France
17th-century French Roman Catholic bishops
17th-century French diplomats
People from Île-de-France
Dukes of Verneuil
French knights
House of Bourbon (France)
Bishops of Metz
Illegitimate children of Henry IV of France
Peers created by Louis XIV
Ambassadors of France to England